systemd-boot is a free and open-source boot manager created by obsoleting the gummiboot project and merging it into systemd in May 2015.

gummiboot was developed by the Red Hat employees Kay Sievers and Harald Hoyer and designed as a minimal alternative to GNU GRUB for systems using the Unified Extensible Firmware Interface (UEFI). It automatically detected bootable images (including operating systems and other boot loaders), did not require a configuration file, provided a basic menu-based interface, and could also integrate with systemd to provide performance data.

As a word play, the name "gummiboot" means "rubber (inflatable) boat" in German, the native language of its initial developers. Despite being developed by two of its employees, Red Hat's Fedora Project did not use gummiboot for booting UEFI systems; instead, it used efilinux to chainload GRUB.

gummiboot was licensed under LGPL-2.1-or-later, unlike GRUB which is licensed under the GPL-3.0-or-later. This distinction was intended to allow gummiboot to be suitable for use on UEFI systems implementing secure boot, due to concerns surrounding its requirement to distribute all authorization keys (digital certificates) needed to run GPL-v3-licensed software if hardware restrictions such as secure boot are in effect.

See also 

 Comparison of boot loaders

References

External links 
 systemd-boot(7) - Manual page

Free boot loaders
Free software programmed in C
Linux kernel-related software
Linux-only free software